NRST may refer to:

 National retail sales tax
 Non-Resident Speculation Tax, a real-estate tax levied in the Golden Horseshoe
 Nancy Grace Roman Space Telescope, NASA infrared satellite telescope
 School of Natural Resources Science and Technology, former name of the Beaverton, Oregon, USA, high school School of Science and Technology

See also